The men's 25 metres freestyle 1A was one of the events held in Swimming at the 1972 Summer Paralympics in Heidelberg.

There were 2 competitors in the event.

Raffin of France won the gold medal.

Results

Final

References 

Men's 25 metre freestyle 1A